Qminas ( also spelled Qaminas or Kominas or Qmenas) is a village in northwestern Syria, administratively part of the Idlib Governorate, located  southeast of Idlib. Nearby localities include Sarmin to the northeast and Saraqib to the east. According to the Syria Central Bureau of Statistics, Qminas had a population of 2,722 in the 2004 census.

References

Populated places in Idlib District
Towns in Syria